Calvin Nicholson (born July 9, 1967) is a former American football defensive back. He played for the New Orleans Saints in 1989 and 1991, the San Antonio Riders in 1991, the Ohio Glory in 1992 and for the Las Vegas Posse in 1994.

References

1967 births
Living people
American football defensive backs
Oregon State Beavers football players
New Orleans Saints players
San Antonio Riders players
Ohio Glory players
Las Vegas Posse players